Jamie Batley is a lacrosse coach who has coached several teams in the NLL and the Major Series Lacrosse. Batley is also a former player, who played with the Buffalo Bandits, Syracuse Smash, and Pittsburgh CrosseFire.

Batley began his coaching career in Colorado in 2002, when he was hired by new coach Rod Jensen as the offensive coordinator. When Jensen was fired in February 2003, Batley took over as interim coach, and the "interim" tag was removed less than two weeks later. Batley led the Mammoth to a 27-16 record in two and a half seasons, making the playoffs each year, but his contract was not renewed after the 2005 season.

A year later, Batley was hired by the expansion Chicago Shamrox to be their first-ever coach and general manager. After consecutive 6-10 seasons, the Shamrox suspended operations shortly before the 2009 season began, and Batley was out of work again, though not for long.

In January 2009, Batley became the head coach of the Toronto Rock after the Rock fired Glenn Clark. The Rock were 5-8 after Batley took over, and missed the playoffs for the second straight year. After the season, Mike Kloepfer resigned as Director of Lacrosse Operations of the Rock, and Batley applied for the job but was turned down. After Terry Sanderson was announced as the new GM, Batley was informed that he would not be returning as head coach of the Rock.

In March 2016, Batley replaced Dan Perreault as head coach of the Vancouver Stealth, he left the team in 2018.

Statistics

NLL

References

National Lacrosse League coaches
Buffalo Bandits players
Living people
Vancouver Warriors coaches
Toronto Rock coaches
Year of birth missing (living people)
Colorado Mammoth coaches
Chicago Shamrox